Frederick Nelson Deland (December 25, 1843 – August 23, 1922) was an American soldier who fought in the American Civil War. Deland received the country's highest award for bravery during combat, the Medal of Honor, for his action during the Siege of Port Hudson in Louisiana on May 27, 1863. He was honored with the award on June 22, 1896.

Biography
Deland was born in Sheffield, Massachusetts on December 25, 1843. He enlisted in the 41st Massachusetts Volunteer Infantry Regiment. For his action during the Siege of Port Hudson in Louisiana on May 27, 1863, he was honored with the Medal of Honor on June 22, 1896.

After the Civil War, Deland worked at the Grand Mahawie Bank in Great Barrington, Massachusetts, first as a clerk, then a cashier, and finally as its president. In 1875, a gang of robbers broke into his house, binding and gagging Deland's parents and sister, and demanding that he come with them to open the bank vault. They were thwarted, however, by a time lock which had been installed on the vault's door only a few days earlier (one of the first such installations in the country). The gang stole some cash and bonds from the house and left Deland and his family bound but unharmed. They were rescued the next day, after his sister was able to signal neighbors through a window.

Frederick N. Deland died in Pittsfield on August 23, 1922, and his remains are interred at the Mahaiwe Cemetery in Great Barrington.

Medal of Honor citation

See also

List of American Civil War Medal of Honor recipients: A–F

References

1843 births
1922 deaths
People of Massachusetts in the American Civil War
Union Army officers
United States Army Medal of Honor recipients
American Civil War recipients of the Medal of Honor